Deliktaş may refer to:

People
 Nuray Deliktaş (born 1971), Turkish female taekwondo coach and former practitioner

Places
 Deliktaş, Baskil
 Deliktaş, Bitlis, a village
 Deliktaş, Dikili, a village in Izmir Province, Turkey
 Deliktaş, İnebolu, a village
 Deliktaş, Kangal, a village in Sivas Province, Turkey
 Deliktaş, Şenkaya

Other uses
 Deliktaş Tunnel, a railway tunnel near Deliktaş, Kangal in Sivas Province, Turkey

Turkish-language surnames